The Samsung Gear Fit2 is a fitness smartwatch made by Samsung Electronics. The product is made in China. Unveiled in June 2016, the Gear Fit2 is the successor to the Samsung Gear Fit released in 2014.

Compared to the Gear Fit the new wristband has an updated design, built-in GPS, and the ability to automatically recognize different fitness activities. The Gear Fit2 features a barometer and heart rate monitor. It is compatible with Android phones running OS 4.4 or later.

Gear Fit 2 Pro 
The successor to the Gear Fit 2 is the Gear Fit2 Pro, released in 2017. It is water-resistant and has improvements related to underwater activity.

References

External links
 Official website

Samsung wearable devices
Smartwatches
Activity trackers

Tizen-based devices